Köse is a Turkish surname. Notable people with the surname include:
 Bahattin Köse, German-Turkish footballer
 Ibrahim Köse, Finnish footballer of Turkish descent
 Karya Köse (born 1997), Turkish female water polo player
 Nursel Köse, German actress of Turkish descent
 Ramazan Köse, Turkish footballer
 Serkan Köse (born 1976), Swedish politician
 Tevfik Köse, Turkish striker

See also 
 Ćosić, Slavic surname
 Köse, Turkish town

Turkish-language surnames